Hiroshima: The Movie is a radio play written by Michael Wall in 1985. It was produced by BBC Radio in that year, and later rebroadcast in 2003. The play won Sony and Giles Cooper Awards.

Plot and characters
In this love story (with a bit of a twist), a Japanese girl helps a film director as he makes a film about Hiroshima.

References
 Radio Drama
 Best Radio Plays of 1985 - The BBC Giles Cooper Award Winners

1985 plays
Plays by Michael Wall
BBC World Service programmes